The Conness Glacier is on the steep northeast cirque of Mount Conness, east of the Sierra Nevada crest, in the U.S. state of California. The glacier is the largest glacier in the Sierra Nevada north of Tioga Pass or Highway 120.

See also
List of glaciers

References

External links and references

 A map of Conness Glacier

Glaciers of California
Glaciers of the Sierra Nevada (United States)
Glaciers of Mono County, California